The Trưng sisters' rebellion was an armed civil uprising in the south of Han China between 40 AD and 43 AD. In 40 AD, the Vietnamese leader Trưng Trắc and her sister Trưng Nhị rebelled against Chinese authorities in Jiaozhi (in what is now northern Vietnam). In 42 AD, Han China dispatched General Ma Yuan to lead an army to strike down the Yue rebellion of the Trưng sisters. In 43 AD, the Han army fully suppressed the uprising and regained complete control. The Trưng sisters were captured and beheaded by the Han forces, although Vietnamese chronicles of the defeat records that the two sisters, having lost to Han forces, decided to commit suicide by jumping down the Hát Giang river, so as not to surrender to the Han.

Background

One prominent group of ancient people in Northern Vietnam (Jiaozhi, Tonkin, Red River Delta region) during the Han dynasty's rule over Vietnam was called the Lac Viet or the Luòyuè in Chinese annals. The Luoyue had been indigenous to the region. They practiced non-Chinese tribal ways and slash-and-burn agriculture. According to French sinologist Georges Maspero, some Chinese immigrants arrived and settled along the Red River during the usurpation of Wang Mang (9–25) and the early Eastern Han, while two Han governors of Jiaozhi Xi Guang (?-30 AD) and Ren Yan, with support from Chinese scholar-immigrants, conducted the first "sinicization" on the local tribes by introducing Chinese-style marriage, opening the first Chinese schools, and introducing Chinese philosophies, therefore provoking cultural conflict. American philologist Stephen O'Harrow indicates that the introduction of Chinese-style marriage customs might have come in the interest of transferring land rights to Chinese immigrants in the area, replacing the matrilineal tradition of the area.

The Trưng sisters were daughters of a wealthy aristocratic family of Lac ethnicity. Their father had been a Lac lord in Mê Linh district (modern-day Mê Linh District, Hanoi). Trưng Trắc (Zheng Ce)'s husband was Thi Sách (Shi Suo), was also the Lac lord of Chu Diên (modern-day Khoái Châu District, Hưng Yên Province). Su Ding (governor of Jiaozhi 37–40), the Chinese governor of Jiaozhi province at the time, is remembered by his cruelty and tyranny. According to Hou Hanshu, Thi Sách was "of a fierce temperament".  Trưng Trắc, who was likewise described as "possessing mettle and courage", fearlessly stirred her husband to action. As a result, Su Ding attempted to restrain Thi Sách with laws, literally beheading him without trial. Trưng Trắc became the central figure in mobilizing the Lac lords against the Chinese.

Revolt
In March of 40 AD, Trưng Trắc and her younger sister Trưng Nhị (Zheng Er), led the Lac Viet people to rise up in rebellion against the Han. The Hou Han Shu recorded that Trưng Trắc launched the rebellion in avenge the killing of her dissent husband. Other sources indicate that Trưng Trắc's movement towards rebellion was influenced by the loss of land intended for her inheritance due to the replacement of traditional matrilineal customs. It began at the Red River Delta, but soon spread to other Lac tribes and non-Han people from an area stretching from Hepu to Rinan. Chinese settlements were overrun, and Su Ting fled. The uprising gained the support of about sixty-five towns and settlements. Trưng Trắc was proclaimed as the queen. Even though she gained control over the countryside, she was not able to capture the fortified towns.

Han counterattack

The Han government (situated in Luoyang) responded rather slowly to the emerging situation. In May or June of 42 AD, Emperor Guangwu gave the orders to initiate a military campaign. The strategic importance of Jiaozhi is underscored by the fact that the Han sent their most trusted generals, Ma Yuan and Duan Zhi to suppress the rebellion. Ma Yuan was given the title Fubo Jiangjun (伏波將軍; General who Calms the Waves). He would later go down in Chinese history as a great official who brought Han civilization to the barbarians.

Ma Yuan and his staff began mobilizing a Han army in southern China. It consisted 20,000 regulars and 12,000 regional auxiliaries. From Guangdong, Ma Yuan dispatched a fleet of supply ships along the coast.

In the spring of 42, the imperial army reached high ground at Lãng Bạc, in the Tiên Du mountains of what is now Bắc Ninh. Yuan's forces battled the Trưng sisters, beheaded several thousand of Trưng Trắc’s partisans, while more than ten thousand surrendered to him. The Chinese general pushed on to victory. During the campaign he explained in a letter to his nephews how “greatly” he detested groundless criticism of proper authority. Yuan pursued Trưng Trắc and her retainers to Jinxi Tản Viên, where
her ancestral estates were located; and defeated them several times. Increasingly isolated and cut off from supplies, the two women were unable to sustain their last stand and the Chinese captured both sisters in early 43. Trắc’s husband, Thi Sách, escaped to Mê Linh, ran to a place called Jinxijiu and was not captured until three years later. The rebellion was brought under control by April or May. Ma Yuan decapitated Trưng Trắc and Trưng Nhị, and sent their heads to the Han court at Luoyang. By the end of 43 AD, the Han army had taken full control over the region by defeating the last pockets of resistance. Yuan reported his victories, and added: “Since I came to Jiaozhi, the current troop has been the most magnificent."

Aftermath

In their reconquest of Jiaozhi and Jiuzhen, Han forces also appear to have massacred most of the Lạc Việt aristocracy, beheading five to ten thousand people and deporting several hundred families to China. After the Trưng sisters were dead, Ma
Yuan spent most of the year 43 building up Han administration in the Red River Delta and preparing the local society for direct Han rule. General Ma Yuan aggressively sinicized the culture and customs of the local people, removing their tribal ways, so they could be more easily governed by Han China. He melted down the Lac bronze drums, their chieftains' symbol of authority, to cast a statue of a horse, which he presented to Emperor Guangwu when he returned to Luoyang in the autumn of 44 AD. In Ma Yuan’s letter to his nephews while campaigning in Jiaozhi, he quoted a Chinese saying: "If you do not succeed in sculpting a swan, the result will still look like a duck." Ma Yuan then divided the Tây Vu (Xiyu, modern day Phú Thọ province) County into Fengxi County and Wanghai County, seized the last domain of the last Lạc monarch of Cổ Loa. Later, Chinese historians writing of Ma Yuan's expedition referred to the Luo/Lạc as the "Luoyue" or simply as the "Yue". "Yue" had become a category of Chinese perception designating myriad groups of non-Chinese peoples in the south. The Chinese considered the Lac to be a "Yue" people, and it was customary to attribute certain cliched cultural traits to the Lạc in order to identify them as "Yue".

Demise of the Dongson culture and the rise of Li-Lao culture
The Trung sisters' defeat in 43 AD also subsequently coincided with the end of Dong Son culture and Dong Son metallurgical drum tradition that had been flourished in Northern Vietnam for centuries, as the Han tightened their grips over the region and culminated the civilizing progress that transforms and affects on non-Sinic people. Local Red River Delta elites pledged themselves to Chinese cultural norms and Chinese hierarchy. Chinese techniques, religions, and taxation were forced upon or voluntarily embraced by indigenous tribes. The regions' demographics and history shifted. Jiaozhou or the Red River Delta gradually became semi-integrated into Chinese empires through Han to Jin dynasty. No large-scale uprising occurred in the region for roughly 400 years. The successful reconquest of Northern Vietnam also gave the Han dynasty secured gateways to access southern maritime trade routes and establish ties with various polities in Southeast Asia and beyond, and increasing relationships between China and the Indian Ocean world. The Han records mention a distant Daqin (whether Rome or not) embassy came from the South and entered the Han empire through Rinan (Central Vietnam) in 166 AD. Along with trade and knowledge, religions such as Buddhism, possibly spread to China via Northern Vietnam from southern sea, along with obvious inland Silk Road, during the second and third centuries.

The decline of Dong Son culture in the Red River Delta led to the rise of the Li Lao drum culture (200–750 AD) in the mountainous areas between the Pearl and the Red River, or the People between the Two Rivers, stretching from present-day Guangdong, Guangxi, to Northern Vietnam. The culture was known for casting large Heger type II drums that share many similarities with Dong Son's Heger type I drums. Lǐ (俚) and Lǎo (獠) are interchangeably perceived as non-Chinese and contemporary sources did not prefer a specific ethnicity for them, the culture could have been multiethnic as modern Vietnam and Southern China are, made up by primary Kra-Dai and Austroasiatic speaking tribes, but some probably were ancestors of modern-day Li people in Hainan. After the collapse of the Han dynasty in the early third century AD and China being in the state of turmoil for approximately 400 years, no Chinese dynasty was strong enough to exert its control and influence over this region until the powerful Tang dynasty, while numerous independent Dong chiefdoms represent the Li Lao drum culture's autonomy, created the voidness of imperial authorities in the regions that were inside the empire. According to researcher Catherine Churchman in her 2016 book The People Between the Rivers: The Rise and Fall of a Bronze Drum Culture, 200–750 CE, due to Li-Lao culture's massive dominantly influences, instead of becoming more assimilated into China, the Red River Delta from 200 to 750 AD experienced a reverse effect on sinicization or "de-Sinifying effect", therefore the history of sinicization of the region should be reconsidered.

Perception
The Trưng sisters' rebellion marked a brilliant epoch for women in ancient southern China and reflected the important of women in early Vietnamese society. One reason for the defeat is the desertion by rebels because they did not believe they could win under a woman's leadership. The fact that women were in charge was blamed as a reason for the defeat by historical Vietnamese texts. Vietnamese historians were ridiculing and mocking men for the fact that they did nothing while "mere girls", whom they viewed with revulsion, took up the banner of revolt-the Vietnamese poem which talked about the revolt of the Trung Sisters while the men did nothing was not intended to praise women nor view war as women's work as it has been wrongly interpreted.

The Vietnamese proverb Giặc đến nhà, đàn bà cũng đánh ("when the enemy is at the gate, even the women go out fighting") has been recited as evidence of Lạc women's respected status. The quote means that fighting in war is inappropriate for women and its only when the situation is so desperate that the war has spread to their home then women should enter the war.

See also
 Lady Triệu
 Phùng Thị Chính
 Copper columns of Ma Yuan
 Bùi Thị Xuân
 Matriarchy
 Feminism

Notes

Citation

Bibliography
  

 

 
  

 

 

43
40s conflicts
1st-century rebellions
Rebellions in the Han dynasty
Wars involving the Han dynasty
Military campaigns involving Vietnam
Emperor Guangwu of Han
China–Vietnam relations
Trưng sisters